Nel blu dipinto di blu may refer to:
"Nel blu, dipinto di blu" (song), a 1958 Italian song by Domenico Modugno;
Nel blu, dipinto di blu (film), a 1959 Italian film by Piero Tellini.